Givira clathrata is a moth in the family Cossidae. It is found in French Guiana.

References

Givira
Moths described in 1910